Ramadhania Ardiansyah Bakrie, born Prianti Nur Ramadhani and known professionally as Nia Ramadhani (born 16 April 1990) is an Indonesian celebrity.

Career
Ramadhani entered the entertainment industry as a dancer in 1995. She started acting in 2004, when she had a lead role in Bawang Merah Bawang Putih alongside  and Revalina S. Temat. By 2007 she had appeared in more than 10 soap operas and also in films.

In 2008, she starred in the horror film , where she had to appear in a bikini. Her mother disapproved when she saw the scene.

She retired from show business shortly after her marriage in 2010, but after the birth of her first child in 2012, had a lead role in the 2013 TV drama series . She returned again in 2018.

Personal life
On 1 April 2010, she married , the son of Indonesian politician and entrepreneur Aburizal Bakrie. She retired from show business shortly afterward, and changed her name to Ramadhania Ardie Bakrie. They have three children.

She and her husband were arrested in July 2021 along with their driver and all three were charged with violating narcotics laws. Ramadhani admitted having started using methamphetamine while working as an actress, and having used it repeatedly since her father's death in 2014. In January 2022, all three were sentenced to a year in prison; prosecutors had requested mandatory drug treatment.

Filmography

Film

Television

References

External links

Living people
1990 births
Indo people
Sundanese people
Actresses from Jakarta
Indonesian film actresses
Indonesian socialites
Indonesian television actresses
Bakrie family